Yulia Livinskaya (born July 31, 1990) is a Russian freestyle skier, specializing in ski cross.

Livinskaya competed at the 2010 Winter Olympics for Russia. She placed 32nd in the qualifying round in ski cross, to advance to the knockout stages. She did not finish her first round heat, and did not advance.

As of April 2013, her best finish at the World Championships is 20th, in 2011.

Livinskaya made her World Cup debut in March 2009. As of April 2013, her best finish at a World Cup event is 10th, coming at two events in 2011/12. Her best World Cup overall finish in ski cross is 20th, in 2011/12.

References

1990 births
Living people
People from Tryokhgorny
Olympic freestyle skiers of Russia
Freestyle skiers at the 2010 Winter Olympics
Freestyle skiers at the 2014 Winter Olympics
Russian female freestyle skiers
Sportspeople from Chelyabinsk Oblast